The Luv Show is an album by the American musician Ann Magnuson. It was released in 1995 on Geffen Records. Magnuson later developed a stage production based on the album.

Critical reception

The Hamilton Spectator called the album "a hoot from start to finish, a hilariously horny musical about a small-town girl who gets the education of her life when she arrives in Hollywood." The New York Times deemed it "a quirky, 50's-styled concept album." The Calgary Herald wrote that "Magnuson plays the raving bimbo one moment and the poetic Jungian the next, crafting a hilarious song cycle that sways from lounge, surf punk and artsy East-side New York dope-rock without losing your attention."

Track listing

"Dead Moth"
"This Nothing Life"
"Waterbeds of Hollywood"
"It's a Great Feeling (Tease)"
"Sex With the Devil"
"It's a Great Feeling"
"Miss Pussy Pants"
"Live, You Vixen!"
"Some Kind of a Swinger"
"L.A. Donut Day"
"M.K.C.F."
"Swinger (Reprise)"
"Man With No Face"
"I Remember You"

Album credits

Songstress: Ann Magnuson
Producer: Don Fleming
Engineer: Adam Kaspar

In Los Angeles
Supersession band:
Guitar – Art Byington
Bass – Richie Lee
Drums, Percussion, Effects – Mike Kelley
L.A. Studio: Chéz Kelley
L.A. Remote: Your Place Or Mine
Assistant Engineer: Tom Nellen

In New York City
Keyboards and Accordion – Tom Judson
Guitars – Randolph A. Hudson III, Dave Rick, Dom Fleming, Ann Magnuson
Percussion – David Licht
Trombone – Christoper Washburne
Trumpet – John Walsh 
Theremin – Walter Sear, Don Fleming
NYC Studio: Sear Sound
Engineer: Bil Emmons
Mastering: Greg Calbi at Masterdisk, NY, NY
Vibeology: Jim Dunbar

with special guest star Jim Thirlwell as "That Satan Guy"

References

1995 albums